The David Bachrach House, also known as Gertrude Stein House, is a historic home located at Baltimore, Maryland, United States. It is a late 19th-century Victorian style frame structure consisting of two stories plus a mansard roof in height. It was constructed about 1886 and occupied by David Bachrach (1845-1921), a commercial photographer who figures prominently in the annals of American photographic history. Also on the property is a one-story brick building on a high foundation that was built for Ephraim Keyser (1850-1937) as a sculpture studio about 1890 and a one-story brick stable. Ephraim Keyser and Fannie (Keyser) Bachrach were brother and sister.  Gertrude Stein (1874-1946) was a niece of Mrs. David Bachrach [Fannie (Keyser) Bachrach] and lived in this house for a short time in 1892.

The David Bachrach House was listed on the National Register of Historic Places in 1985.

References

External links
, including photo dated 1984, at Maryland Historical Trust
A Baltimore house known for its famous residents is brought back to life

German-Jewish culture in Baltimore
Houses completed in 1886
Houses in Baltimore
Houses on the National Register of Historic Places in Baltimore
Gothic Revival architecture in Maryland
Reservoir Hill, Baltimore
Victorian architecture in Maryland